The engines of Baden Class I b were very early German steam locomotives built for the Grand Duchy of Baden State Railways.

History 

The Class I b locomotives were copies of the first six Baden machines, the Class I a. The Badenia built by Emil Kessler in 1841 was the first locomotive to be built in Baden and the first of nine engines of its class. Kessler built this engine together with his partner Martiensen at his own expense and then placed it experimentally in service. Because it achieved the same level of performance as its English prototypes, it was taken over by the state railway.

On the line between Heidelberg und Wiesloch one locomotive achieved a speed of 54 km/h with 20 wagons. On a fast run the engines could manage 85 km/h.

The majority of the engines were retired by 1863. Only the last one was converted in 1854 into a tank locomotive and stayed in service until 1867. She had a water capacity of 1.45 m3 and coal capacity of 1.8 t.

Technical description 

The locomotives had the same piston stroke as their English counterparts and were also equipped with a fork valve gear (Gabelsteuerung). The locomotive OFFENBURG had a Capry valve gear on delivery. The engines had improved running gear however due to their adjustable leaf springs and centre axle box.  
The last engine of this class, EXPANSION No. 15, had a Meyer double rocker (Doppelschwing) valve gear, a larger cylinder bore of 381 mm, higher boiler pressure of 5.0 bar and 101 heating tubes. Its larger heating area generated an increase in power.

The locomotives were originally built for 1,600 mm broad gauge, but converted in 1854 to standard gauge. At the same time they were given Capry valve gear, apart from CARLSRUHE and PHOENIX which were fitted with Stephenson valve gear.

The engines had a Sharp boiler barrel. The vertical boiler had a rounded top. On the foremost boiler section was the steam dome with a safety valve and spring balances. The frame comprised two outside stiffener frame sections (Futterrahmen) and four plate frame sections (Plattenrahmen) for the steam engine.  The EXPANSION had two plate frame sections.

The vehicles were equipped with a Kessler type tender of class 2 T 5.4 or 3 T 5.4.

See also
Grand Duchy of Baden State Railways
List of Baden locomotives and railbuses

Footnotes and references

Sources 
 Hermann Lohr, Georg Thielmann: Lokomotiv-Archiv Baden. transpress, Berlin 1988, 

01 b (old)
2-2-2 locomotives
Standard gauge locomotives of Germany
5 ft 3 in gauge locomotives
1A1 n2 locomotives
Passenger locomotives